Mullaquana is a suburb in the Australian state of South Australia located immediately adjoining the southern side of the city of Whyalla in the north east corner of Eyre Peninsula.  The locality is bounded by Lincoln Highway to its northern side, the suburb of Whyalla to the east and by and the Spencer Gulf coastline to the south east.  

Its boundaries were established in June 2000 and revised again in 2011.  Its name is derived from Mullaquana Road which is located within the locality and was selected instead of “Eight Mile Creek” in order to avoid confusion with a locality in the south east of South Australia.

Mullaquana is located within the federal Division of Grey, the state electoral district of Giles and with the portion on western side of Horseshoe Road being within the boundary of  local government area of the City of Whyalla and the portion on the eastern side being within the unincorporated areas of South Australia. 

The land within the City of Whyalla jurisdiction contains the Whyalla Airport and areas zoned for both commercial activity and residential use.  The land within the unincorporated area is one of two such parcels of land associated with the city of Whyalla which is considered by the Government of South Australia as being “strategically important to the state” due to their role in the production cycle of steel.

See also
List of cities and towns in South Australia

References

Places in the unincorporated areas of South Australia
Suburbs of Whyalla